KY Cygni is a red supergiant of spectral class M3.5Ia located in the constellation Cygnus. It is approximately 5,000 light-years away.

Observations
KY Cyg lies near the bright open cluster NGC 6913, but is not thought to be a member.  The location is close to the bright star γ Cygni. It was identified as a variable star in 1930, and later named as KY Cygni.  The spectrum was given the MK classification of M3 Ia, with only minor adjustments since.

KY Cygni is heavily reddened due to interstellar extinction, losing an estimated 7.75 magnitudes at visual wavelengths. It would be a naked eye star if no light was lost.

Properties

KY Cygni is classified as a luminous red supergiant with a strong stellar wind.

The radius corresponding to the higher luminosity would be . These parameters are larger and more luminous than expected for any red supergiant, making them doubtful.

KY Cygni is a variable star with a large amplitude but no clear periodicity. At times, it varies rapidly, at others it is fairly constant for long periods.  The photographic magnitude range is given as 13.5 - 15.5, while a visual range is 10.60 - 11.74.

References

External links
 http://jumk.de/astronomie/big-stars/ky-cygni.shtml
 http://www.astronomy.com/asy/default.aspx?c=a&id=2772
List of Largest Stars Gets 3 New Chart Toppers, Robert Roy Britt, space.com, 10 January 2005.  Accessed on line November 12, 2010.

M-type supergiants
Cygnus (constellation)
Slow irregular variables
Cygni, KY
J20255805+3821076
IRAS catalogue objects
M-type hypergiants